Matt O'Connor may refer to:

 Matt O'Connor (activist), (born 1967) founder and leader of Fathers 4 Justice
 Matt O'Connor (ice hockey) (born 1992), Canadian ice hockey player
 Matt O'Connor (rugby union) (born 1971), Australian rugby player and coach
 Matt O'Connor (Cyber Security) (born 1985), Irish Cyber Security Expert

See also 
 Matthew O'Connor (disambiguation)